Stuart David Munro (born 15 September 1962 in Falkirk) is a Scottish former professional football player, who is best known for his time with Rangers.

Munro was signed from Alloa Athletic and made his top team debut for the Rangers against Dundee on 25 February 1984, aged 21. The game ended in a 3–1 win. He played a further six seasons before with Rangers before being sold to Blackburn Rovers for £350,000.

He emigrated to Australia at the end of his career, appearing for Sydney United in the National Soccer League in what would be his final season of professional football.

Upon retirement, he followed a coaching path, taking the reins at NSL clubs Gippsland Falcons, Carlton, Parramatta Power and South Melbourne.

With the end of that competition, Munro remained in Melbourne and was manager at Oakleigh Cannons from 2005 to 2008. Following the 2008 season he was appointed manager at Dandenong Thunder where he remained until 2011 when he was appointed assistant manager to his former Rangers teammate Ian Ferguson at Perth Glory. Munro spent 3 season as assistant at Perth Glory. He returned to the Thunder as manager in 2013 before taking on the role of technical director for the 2014 season. Munro once again took on the role as manager in 2015 but that season saw the club relegated from the Victorian top-flight. After leaving his role at Dandenong, Munro was appointed as the inaugural manager for newly founded Women's NPL Victoria club Southern United. At the end of the 2016 season Stuart was poached by Dandenong City for the 2017 NPL2 season. In 2019 he was appointed as head coach of Melbourne Knights ahead of the 2020 season.

Honours

Player 
 Rangers
Scottish Premier Division: 1986–87, 1988–89, 1989–90, 1990–91
Scottish Cup: Runners-up 1988–89
Scottish League Cup: 1986–87, 1987–88, 1988–89, 1990–91
Runners-up 1989–90

Manager 
Oakleigh Cannons
VPL Minor Premiership: 2006

Dandenong Thunder
VPL Minor Premiership: 2009

Individual
Victorian Coach of the Year: 2006, 2009

References

External links

1962 births
Living people
St Mirren F.C. players
Alloa Athletic F.C. players
Rangers F.C. players
Blackburn Rovers F.C. players
Bristol City F.C. players
Falkirk F.C. players
Scottish footballers
Blacktown City FC players
Scottish Football League players
National Soccer League (Australia) players
Sydney United 58 FC players
Association football defenders
Scottish football managers
Scottish expatriate football managers
Scotland B international footballers
Footballers from Falkirk
South Melbourne FC managers
Bo'ness United F.C. players
Scottish expatriate sportspeople in Australia
Expatriate soccer managers in Australia
Expatriate soccer players in Australia
Scottish expatriate footballers